Guidanroumdji (var. Guidan Roumdji, Guidan Roumji)is a town and urban commune in Niger.

References

Communes of Niger